The cleithrum (plural cleithra) is a membrane bone which first appears as part of the skeleton in primitive bony fish, where it runs vertically along the scapula. Its name is derived from Greek κλειθρον = "key (lock)", by analogy with "clavicle" from Latin clavicula = "little key".

In modern fishes, the cleithrum is a large bone that extends upwards from the base of the pectoral fin and anchors to the cranium above the gills, forming the posterior edge of the gill chamber. The bone has scientific use as a means to determine the age of fishes.

The lobe-finned fishes share this arrangement. In the earliest amphibians however, the cleithrum/clavicle complex came free of the skull roof, allowing for a movable neck. The cleithrum disappeared early in the evolution of reptiles, and in amniotes is very small or absent.

It has been argued based on position, muscle connectivity, and developmental origin that the nuchal element of the turtle carapace is formed from fused cleithra.

See also
 Age determination in fish

References

Skeletal system
Upper limb anatomy
Shoulder